Stephen Joseph Harmelin (born May 7, 1939) is an American lawyer who specializes in corporate and transactional law. He is the co-chairman of the Philadelphia based law firm Dilworth Paxson LLP. He also served as the White House Director of Speechwriting and as a White House aide for President Lyndon B. Johnson from 1964 to 1965.

Early life and education
Harmlein was born to a Jewish family in Philadelphia, Pennsylvania. Harmelin attended Central High School. He later went on to graduate from the University of Pennsylvania and Harvard Law School. He served in the United States Coast Guard.

Career
Harmelin began practicing law in 1964. From 1964 to 1965, Harmelin served as the White House Director of Speechwriting and as a White House Aide to President Lyndon B. Johnson. Johnson tasked Harmelin with the creation of the White House Fellows program. In 1970, Harmelin served as a Special Philadelphia Assistant District Attorney.

Since 1965, Harmelin has worked as a lawyer at Dilworth Paxson LLP. In 1989, Harmelin was appointed by Pennsylvania Governor, Bob Casey Sr. as a Commissioner on the Board of the Pennsylvania Convention Center Authority. He served in that role until 2002. In 1992, he served as General Counsel for the Legislative Reapportionment Commission on behalf of the Pennsylvania State Senate and the Pennsylvania General Assembly. From 2007 to 2008, he worked as the receiver ad litem for the Commodity Futures Trading Commission and recovered $170 million, the largest in the commission's history. He also served as a member of the Third Circuit Court of Appeals Task Force to select counsel in certain lawsuits.

Harmelin serves as a Trustee and General Counsel to the National Constitution Center. Harmelin was awarded the Replansky Award by the Philadelphia Bar Association Corporate Law Committee for distinguished accomplishments in civics, law and professionalism.

Personal life
Harmelin is the founder of the Philadelphia Constitution Foundation where he led a project to bring the Magna Carta to Philadelphia in 1987 and 2001. He also sits on the Board of the Barnes Foundation, the Atlantic Legal Foundation, the College of Physicians of Philadelphia and The Philadelphia Inquirer. He appeared in the History Channel show Save Our History where he spoke about the National Constitution Center.

Harmelin was close friends with former longtime Pennsylvania Senator, Arlen Specter. He served as the Treasurer for Specter's successful re-election campaign in 2004.

References

1939 births
American political fundraisers
Corporate lawyers
Harvard Law School alumni
Jewish American government officials
Lawyers from Philadelphia
Living people
Pennsylvania lawyers
People from Philadelphia
Central High School (Philadelphia) alumni
United States Coast Guard officers
University of Pennsylvania alumni
21st-century American Jews